Wolfgang Lüderitz (born 8 May 1936) is a German modern pentathlete. He competed for East Germany at the 1968 Summer Olympics.

References

1936 births
Living people
German male modern pentathletes
Olympic modern pentathletes of East Germany
Modern pentathletes at the 1968 Summer Olympics
Sportspeople from Schleswig-Holstein